Neohyparpalus parcepunctatus is a species of beetle in the family Carabidae, the only species in the genus Neohyparpalus.

References

Harpalinae
Monotypic Carabidae genera